The Freedom Socialist Party is a left-wing socialist political party with a revolutionary feminist philosophy based in the United States. It views the struggles of women and minorities as part of the struggle of the working class. It emerged from a split in the United States Socialist Workers Party in 1966. The party's Seattle branch, with support from individuals in other cities, split off from the SWP over what it described as the SWP's entrenched opportunism and undemocratic methods. The party has branches and members in the United States, as well as Australia, England, Germany and New Zealand. The current National Secretary of the FSP is Doug Barnes.

History 

The immediate forerunner of the FSP was the Kirk-Kaye tendency within the Socialist Workers Party (SWP), led by Richard S. Fraser (Kirk) and Clara Fraser (Kaye) who were then married. At the time, Richard Fraser was seen as the central leader of the tendency due to his development of the theory of revolutionary integrationism. In addition to their distinctive position on civil rights, derived from the theory of revolutionary integrationism, the tendency also took a position that was more sympathetic to China than was the norm in the SWP, in part this being due to the alliance between the Kirk-Kaye tendency and the looser tendency of Arne Swabeck and Frank Glass.

Political differences, as articulated by the tendency, included what was characterized as the SWP's uncritical support of the Black nationalist views of the Nation of Islam, its orientation towards the labor aristocracy and business unionist leaders, its opportunism in the anti-Vietnam War movement, and its dismissive attitude towards the emerging feminist movement. The nascent FSP advocated the class solidarity of Black and white workers, called for a greatly expanded understanding of and attention to women's emancipation, and urged the anti-war movement to support the socialist, anti-colonial aims of the Vietnamese Revolution.

The FSP became a pole of attraction for Seattle leftists opposed to the SWP's internal politics and established a home at Freeway Hall.  The party formed Radical Women with the dual goal of building a revolutionary socialist feminist organization and teaching women the organizational and leadership skills that were often denied to them in male-dominated organizations.

Ideology 

The FSP is politically Trotskyist. FSP leaders Clara Fraser (1923–1998) and Gloria Martin (1916–1995) built on the socialist analysis of women's oppression to create a Leninist party that is "socialist-feminist" in ideology

and practice. The party views the liberation struggles of women, people of color and sexual minorities (such as gay people) as intrinsic to working class revolt, and it looks to these specially-oppressed sectors of society to provide revolutionary leadership. Women comprise a predominant part of the party leadership. Overall, membership is very diverse and is composed of all genders and races. The party characterizes its National Comrades of Color Caucus as offering the party's diverse ranks of people of color an opportunity to work together as a team to grow as leaders and provide direction for the party's work in people of color movements.

Activities 
The party has frequently supported united front efforts on a number of issues and often helps other socialist groups get on the ballot, while simultaneously running its own candidates for office. The FSP was affiliated with the Committee for a Revolutionary Socialist Party, an attempted united front of various Trotskyist parties in the 1970's and 1980's. The United Front Against Fascism (UFAF) was founded by the FSP and included a broad coalition of the Left, the LGBT community, labor unionists, feminists, people of color, Jews, and civil libertarians. UFAF took the lead in mobilizing against neo-Nazis in the Pacific Northwest in the 1980s and 1990s.

The party has branches in a number of U.S. cities, as well as one in Melbourne, Australia. The Freedom Socialist newspaper is produced six times a year. Red Letter Press is the party's publishing arm. The FSP is affiliated with Radical Women, an autonomous socialist feminist organization.
In 2003, Red Letter Press and its managing editor, Helen Gilbert, were the target of a complaint to the Federal Election Commission by the campaign committee of perennial presidential candidate Lyndon LaRouche. LaRouche alleged that Gilbert and the FSP publishing house, which had issued a pamphlet by Gilbert critical of LaRouche's ideology and political history, were in violation of campaign finance laws. The FEC found LaRouche's complaint to be without merit and dismissed it.

Electoral Campaigns 
 
In 1991, the Seattle FSP ran two members, Yolanda Alaniz and Heidi Durham, for Seattle City Council. Alaniz and Durham campaigned on guaranteed income for families living in poverty, community control of the police, and domestic partnership rights for same-sex couples. Alaniz advanced to the general election and lost to Sue Donaldson, finishing with 21% of the vote.

In 2004, Jordana Sardo, party organizer in Portland, Oregon, ran for the Oregon House of Representatives in Oregon's 45th House district, earning 8.74% of the vote.

In 2012, the party ran a write-in presidential campaign with candidates Stephen Durham for U.S. president and Christina López for vice-president. The ticket received 117 votes nationwide. Eight states do not permit write-in candidates, 32 require prior registration to be an official write-in, and many do not report write-ins.

In the 2016 election, the FSP critically endorsed Jeff Mackler of Socialist Action for president.

In 2018, the party announced that member Steve Hoffman would seek to petition onto the ballot for United States Senate against incumbent Democrat Maria Cantwell. Hoffman got 7,390 votes (0.4%) and did not advance to the general election.

The FSP critically endorsed Socialist Action's Jeff Mackler for the 2020 presidential race.

Other FSP campaigns have been run in New York and California.

Further reading

Archives 

 Freedom Socialist Party Seattle Branch Records, 1984-1992. 3.14 cubic feet. At the Labor Archives of Washington, University of Washington Libraries Special Collections.
 Freedom Socialist Party National Office (Seattle) Records, 1976-1998. 3.09 cubic feet. At the Labor Archives of Washington, University of Washington Libraries Special Collections.
 Radical Women Seattle Office Records, 1991-1997. 0.37 cubic feet. At the Labor Archives of Washington, University of Washington Libraries Special Collections.
 Radical Women National Office (Seattle) Records, 1976-1998. 1.28 cubic feet. At the Labor Archives of Washington, University of Washington Libraries Special Collections.
 Melba Windoffer Papers, 1910-1993. 7.42 cubic feet. At the Labor Archives of Washington, University of Washington Libraries Special Collections.
 Megan Cornish Papers, 1970-2003. 10.26 cubic feet. At the Labor Archives of Washington, University of Washington Libraries Special Collections.
 Clara Fraser Papers, 1905-1998, 36.70 cubic feet. At the Labor Archives of Washington, University of Washington Libraries Special Collections.
 Heidi Durham Papers and Oral History Interviews, 1937-2017, 1.57 cubic feet. At the Labor Archives of Washington, University of Washington Libraries Special Collections.

Articles and Interviews 

 Megan Cornish, Seattle Civil Rights and Labor History Project, 2005.
 Megan Cornish Interview with Nicole Grant and Alex Morrow, October 20, 2005, YouTube, uploaded by Seattle Civil Rights and Labor History Project, September 9, 2016, Megan Cornish - YouTube
 Megan Cornish, Conor Casey, and Ellie Belew Interview with Mike Dumovich, "We Do the Work," KSVR, February 22, 2019.
 Nicole Grant, Challenging Sexism at City Light: The Electrical Trades Trainee Program, Seattle Civil Rights and Labor History Project, 2006.
 Ellie Belew Interview with Mimi Rosenberg, YouTube, uploaded by Radical Women - U.S., uploaded March 28. 2019, HIGH VOLTAGE WOMEN: Interview & slideshow

Books 

 Ellie Belew, High Voltage Women: Breaking Barriers at Seattle City Light, Red Letter Press, 2019.

See also 
 Clara Fraser
 Radical Women
 Megan Cornish
 Heidi Durham
 Socialism and Liberty Party
 Party for Socialism and Liberation

References 

 
Communist parties in the United States
Far-left politics in the United States
Political parties in the United States
1966 establishments in Washington (state)